David Hoey may refer to:
 David Hoey (hurler)
 David Hoey (window dresser)